Operation Gold Fish is a 2019 Indian Telugu-language action thriller film written and directed by Sai Kiran Adivi and produced by Vinayakudu Talkies, U&I Entertainments. The story is inspired by true events of mass exodus of Kashmiri Pandits from the valley in the 1990s. The film starring Aadi as an NSG commando, Nithya Naresh, Sasha Chhetri, Karthik Raju and Parvateesam, has Abburi Ravi, the Telugu writer, as the antagonist. The patriotic thriller has Aadi playing an NSG commando.

With the abrogation of Article 370 in Jammu and Kashmir, the script has been changed to suit the current scenario, and new scenes were shot reflecting the aspirations of Kashmiri Pandits. The film was released on 18 October 2019.
This movie got mixed reviews from critics and was also a box-office bomb

Cast 
 Aadi as NSG team commander Arjun Pandit
 Nithya Naresh as Nithya Sharma (Minister Sharma's daughter)
 Karthik Raju as Karthik Raju
 Sasha Chettri as Tanya (Karthik's love interest)
 Parvateesam as Solemn (Karthik's friend)
 Anish Kuruvilla as Anish Kuruvilla, NIA Officer
 Rao Ramesh as Mr. S.K. Sharma (External Affair's Minister)
 Abburi Ravi as Ghazi Baba, Terrorist leader
 Manoj Nandam as Farooq Iqbal Iraqi, Terrorist
 Keertana Allamraju
 Krishnudu as Watchman 
 Ramajogayya Sastry as Solemn's father
Srini Dhanala as Srini Pillai (Hacker)

Soundtrack 

The soundtrack of the film is composed by Sricharan Pakala and lyrics by Ramajogayya Sastry.

Reception
Operation Gold Fish got mixed reviews from critics

A critic from 123telugu.com rated the film 2.75 out of 5 and wrote "Operation Gold Fish is a passable patriotic drama which has a select few good moments. The setup is good but a disappointing screenplay and unnecessary scenes take away the grip from the proceedings."

Neeshita Nyayapati from The Times of India rated the film 2 out of 5 and wrote "Operation Gold Fish just ends up being a hot mess that could’ve been handled with a little more sensitivity."

References

External links
 

2019 action thriller films
2019 films
Indian action thriller films
2010s Telugu-language films
Films shot in Jammu and Kashmir
Indian films based on actual events
Films set in the 1980s
Indian Army in films
Films set in Jammu and Kashmir
Films scored by Sricharan Pakala
Films directed by Sai Kiran Adivi